Jung Eun-woo (Korean: 정은우; Hanja: 鄭銀雨; born July 1, 1998), known mononymously as Eunwoo, is a South Korean singer. She is known for her participation on Produce 101 and being a former member of Pristin, it's sub-group Pristin V and Hinapia.

Early life and education 
Eunwoo was born on July 1, 1998, in Bucheon, Gyeonggi, South Korea. She attended Jungwon Girls Middle School before attending Seoul School of Performing Arts for practical music where she graduated in 2016.

Career

2012-2015: Pre-debut 
In 2012, Eunwoo participated in Superstar K4 but she was eliminated. The following year she appeared on The Voice Kids as well as National Singing Contest. Through these shows she was recruited by Pledis Entertainment to become a trainee in 2013 and training for over two years. During that time she appeared in the music videos of other label mates such as Orange Caramel and Seventeen.

2016-2019: Produce 101 and Pristin
In 2016, Eunwoo, along with six other female trainees in her company, joined the Mnet survival show Produce 101 which aired from January 22 to April 1, 2016. The premise of the show was to create an eleven-member girl group from an array of 101 female trainees coming from various companies, the final eleven girls would promote for a year under YMC Entertainment. Eunwoo's fate was cut short when she got eliminated in the last episode, ultimately ranking 21st. But her two label mates Nayoung and Kylkyung ended up becoming members of the final group, I.O.I.

The following month, Eunwoo was confirmed as a member of Pledis Entertainment's new girl group nicknamed Pledis Girlz. From May 14 to September 10, 2016, the group held various concerts in order to promote themselves before debuting. On June 27, the group released their single digital preview, "We", which Eunwoo helped compose with fellow group mate Sungyeon. In addition, Eunwoo released a collaborative single "Sickness", featuring Vernon, as a part of the soundtrack for the television series Love Revolution. On January 6, 2017, Pledis Girlz performed their last concert titled, "Bye & Hi", where they announced their official group name, Pristin. Two months later Pledis Entertainment announced Pristin's debut through a promotional image and they made their official debut on March 27, launching their EP, "Hi! Pristin" with the lead single "Wee Woo". Eunwoo, along with other members, participated in the production of the album.

In May 2018,  it was revealed that Eunwoo would be a part of Pristin's first sub-unit, Pristin V, along with other members Nayoung, Roa, Rena, and Kyulkyung. The unit debuted on May 28 with the single album "Like a V" featuring the lead single "Get It".

On May 24, 2019, Pristin officially disbanded after a prolonged hiatus and Pledis announced that Eunwoo would be terminating her contract.

2019-2020: Re-debut with Hinapia and disbandment 
On October 21, 2019, it was announced that Eunwoo alongside previous Pristin members, Minkyeung, Yaebin and Gyeongwon, were re-debuting under AlSeulBit Entertainment, which was later renamed to OSR Entertainment, with an additional member, Bada. She was the main vocalist and face of the group. On October 24, the group was revealed to be named Hinapia. They made their debut on November 3, 2019, with single album "New Start". But the group was short lived and announced their disbandment on August 21, 2020, with all the members terminating their contracts.

Discography

Soundtrack Appearances

Television Series

Composition Credit 
Credits are adapted from the Korea Music Copyright Association unless otherwise specified.

References 

1998 births
Living people
People from Bucheon
South Korean female idols
Pledis Entertainment artists
Pristin members
Produce 101 contestants
South Korean dance musicians
South Korean women pop singers
21st-century South Korean singers
21st-century South Korean women singers